Hughes AN/TPQ-37 Firefinder Weapon Locating System is a mobile radar system developed in the late 1970s by Hughes Aircraft Company, achieving Initial Operational Capability in 1980 and full deployment in 1984. Currently manufactured by ThalesRaytheonSystems, the system is a long-range version of "weapon-locating radar", designed to detect and track incoming artillery and rocket fire to determine the point of origin for counter-battery fire. It is currently in service at brigade and higher levels in the United States Army and by other countries. The radar is trailer-mounted and towed by a  truck. A typical AN/TPQ-37 system consists of the Antenna-Transceiver Group, Command Shelter and 60 kW Generator.

Operation

The AN/TPQ-37 is an electronically steered radar, meaning the radar does not actually move while in operation. The radar scans a 90-degree sector for incoming rocket, artillery and mortar fire. Upon detecting a possible incoming round, the system verifies the contact before initiating a track sequence, continuing to search for new targets. The incoming round/rocket is tracked during its initial upward/launch trajectory (i.e., the linear portion of its flight path) prior to reaching apogee. A computer program analyzes the track data and then extrapolates the round's point of origin. This calculated point of origin is then reported to the operator with map coordinates, thus allowing friendly artillery to direct counter-battery fire towards the enemy artillery. The system may also be operated in a friendly fire mode to determine the accuracy of counterbattery return fire.

Main characteristics
Capabilities
 Frequency: S-band, 15 frequencies
 Locates mortars, artillery, rocket launchers, and missiles
 Locates targets on first round
 Performs high-burst, datum-plane, and impact registrations
 Adjusts friendly fire
 Interfaces with tactical fire
 Predicts impact of hostile projectiles

Specifications
 Azimuth sector: 1600 mils (90 degrees)
 Prime power: 115/200 VAC, 400 Hz, 3-phase, 43 kW
 Peak transmitted power: 120 kW, min.

Features
 Permanent storage for 99 targets
 Field exercise mode
 Digital data interface

Manufacturer

Before acquisition by Raytheon, the Hughes Aircraft Co. developed the AN/TPQ-37 Firefinder radar at its facility in Fullerton, California, and manufactures it at its plant in Forest, Mississippi.

Upgrades

ROCS for AN/TPQ-36 and AN/TPQ-37

The 'radar operational control system upgrade' is manufactured by BES Electronic Systems Ltd in Israel

  The WLU drum (see right-hand image on http://www.bes.co.il/FireFinder_RCS.htm) is replaced with two 19" LCD screens. Weapon Locations and impacts are displayed on electronic map.
  Radar Shelter includes two Work-Stations for two radar operators. Additional operators can join with optional Notebooks.
  Windows XP Embedded, menus, screens and full GIS electronic maps.
  Automatic operation and high speed AHC using DTED Level II (30 meters between elevation points) to enhance accuracy of weapon location process.
  Support of many digital formats of electronic maps, for example GeoTIFF, Shape files, CADRG, DXF etc.'.
  Weapon locations are displayed on various projections such as UTM, GIS, RSO, Lambert, etc.'.
  Automatic Initialization. High-speed radar programs loading from ROCS computer. (Raymond Cassette is removed)
  Shelter can be controlled from remote using Notebook via LAN.
  Recording of radar operation for off line debriefing. Recording includes weapons, impacts, Friendly registration targets etc.'.
  Storage of up to 500 hostile targets.
  50 Artillery Zones, defined by clicking the electronic map.
  Option for custom-made protocols to communicate radar data and targets to remote Users such as Command & Control, batteries, etc.'.
  UPS with enhanced 28VDC supply system.

Nomenclature

Per the Joint Electronics Type Designation System (JETDS),
the nomenclature AN/TPQ-37 is thus derived:

"AN/" indicating a system nomenclature derived from the JETDS, meaning "Army-Navy"
"T" for "transportable", indicating it is carried by a vehicle but is not an integral part of said vehicle (compare with "V" for vehicle-mounted)
"P" indicating a position finder (RADAR)
"Q" for special-purpose or combination system, in this case counter-battery radar
"37" is an arbitrary numerical designator

See also
COBRA (radar)
ARTHUR (military)
SLC-2 Radar
Swathi Weapon Locating Radar
Penicillin (counter-artillery system)
Red Color

References

External links

ThalesRaytheonSystems
ROCS new upgrades for TPQ-36/37

Radar equipment of the Cold War
Ground radars
Hughes Aircraft Company
Military radars of the United States
Raytheon Company products
Weapon Locating Radar
Military equipment introduced in the 1980s